Dale Ham is a pioneering American gasser drag racer.

Driving a Dodge-powered 1929 Ford, he won NHRA's first-ever C/SR (C Street) championship, at Great Bend, Kansas, in 1955. (His elapsed time was not recorded or has not been preserved.)

He won no other NHRA national gasser championships.

Notes

Sources
Davis, Larry. Gasser Wars, North Branch, MN:  Cartech, 2003, p.180.

Dragster drivers